The Hanger Cotton Gin is a historic cotton gin in Sweet Home, Arkansas.  Built about 1876, it is a rare surviving example of a steam-powered gin.  The main building is a three-story frame structure covered in board-and-batten siding.  The gin was only operated commercially for a brief period, and was out of service by 1892.  Since then, the building has been used as a barn and grain storage facility.  It was probably built by Peter Hanger, whose family has been prominent in the Little Rock business community since that time.

The gin was listed on the National Register of Historic Places in 1976.

See also
National Register of Historic Places listings in Pulaski County, Arkansas

References

Commercial buildings on the National Register of Historic Places in Arkansas
Industrial buildings completed in 1876
Cotton gin
National Register of Historic Places in Pulaski County, Arkansas
1876 establishments in Arkansas
Cotton industry in the United States
Steam power